Kari Heiskanen (born 16 March 1955) is a Finnish actor. He appeared in more than seventy films since 1978.

Selected filmography

References

External links

1955 births
Living people
Finnish male film actors